The rivière à la Chasse (English: Hunting river) is a tributary of the Gulf of St. Lawrence, flowing in the town of Baie-Comeau, in the Manicouagan Regional County Municipality, in the administrative region of Côte-Nord, in the province of Quebec, in Canada.

The western part of the Chasse River valley is served by the Trans-Quebec-Labrador road and forest roads; the lower part, by route 138. In addition to the urban area (Haute-Rive sector) at the end of the segment, forestry is the main economic activity in this valley.

The surface of the Chasse River is usually frozen from the beginning of December to the end of March, except the rapids; however, traffic on the ice is generally safe from mid-December to mid-March.

Geography 
The Chasse River draws its source from Lake Castelnau in Baie-Comeau. This source is located at:
  west of lac à la Chasse;
  north-east of Baie-Comeau town center;
  north-west of the mouth of the Chasse river.

The Chasse river flows between the Amédée River (located on the west side) and the Rivière aux Anglais (east side).
  north-east, relatively in a straight line, to a bay on the north shore of Lac à la Chasse;
  south across Lac à la Chasse to the dam located at its mouth;

The Chasse River flows into the bottom of a small bay on the north shore of the Gulf of Saint Lawrence, between the Haute-Rive sector (east side) and the Baie-Comeau sector (west side), or at:

  north-east of the mouth of the Manicouagan River;
  north of Pointe-Lebel where the regional airport is located;
  north-east of downtown Baie-Comeau.

Toponymy 
The toponym "Rivière à la Chasse" was formalized on December 5, 1968, at the Place Names Bank of the Commission de toponymie du Québec.

See also 
 List of rivers of North Shore

References 

Rivers of Côte-Nord
Manicouagan Regional County Municipality